Venezuelan Australians refers to Australian citizens of Venezuelan descent or birth. According to the 2011 Census there were 3,404 Venezuelan-born citizens who were residing in Australia at the moment of the census. There are an estimated 10,000 Australians of Venezuelan ancestry according to a study of Ivan De La Vega from Simón Bolívar University.

Almost 76% of Venezuelan Australians are concentrated in Eastern Australia.

History and cultural background
Small numbers of Venezuela-born have migrated to Australia since the 1960s, but the majority, about 72.9% of the population, arrived in Australia after 2001 as a part of the brain drain of the Bolivarian diaspora. Most came as skilled migrants, because of uncertainty of economic conditions in Venezuela.

Ancestry

Education and professions
83.7% of Venezuelan Australians over 15 years of age had a form of higher non-school qualifications. 57.6% had an occupation that was either being a skilled managerl, professional or in trade.

Language
The main language spoken at home by Venezuela-born people is Spanish in a 77.7% followed by English with 13.8%. With a difference to others Hispanic Australian diasporas that speaks mainly Romance languages and English languages, an important percent of Venezuelan-born people main language spoken at home is Arabic in 2.6%. The remaining 6% speak others language at home (2% of them speak Italian, and at least 1% of them speak(s) Portuguese).

See also

 Demographics of Australia
 Demographics of Venezuela
 European Australians
 Europeans in Oceania
 Hispanic and Latin American Australians
 Immigration to Australia

References

Resources

 
Venezuelan diaspora
Latin American Australian